James Vincent "Turk" Torello (December 15, 1930 – April 13, 1979 Woodridge, Illinois) was an Italian-American mobster who became a caporegime and leading enforcer for the Chicago Outfit during the mid-to-late 1970s.

Born in Chicago, Illinois, Torello's first arrest was in 1945;  his rap sheet would eventually include convictions for auto theft, armed robbery, burglary and hijacking.  Torello would serve two years in federal prison for violating firearms laws. Torello would serve as capo of the South Side/26th Street crew. Union boss and mob associate John Serpico would later testify after turning informant that he and Torello were born on the same street and lived half a block away from one another.

In the late 1960s, Torello sent Robert "Bobby the Beak" Siegel to Las Vegas to help collect $87,000 from an associate of Frank "Lefty" Rosenthal, the Outfit agent at the Stardust Hotel & Casino.  This story was related by Siegel at the "Family Secrets" organized crime trial, in Chicago, in the summer of 2007.

On another occasion, an angry mob boss Sam Giancana dispatched Torello and mobster Jackie Cerone to kill Outfit member Frank Esposito, in Florida. Luckily for Esposito, the Federal Bureau of Investigation (FBI) secretly recorded Giancana's conversation and warned Esposito. He then settled his dispute with Giancana and the hit was canceled.  According to tape recordings, Torello and his killers had planned to murder Esposito, cut him up in small pieces and feed them to the sharks off the Florida coast.

By the early 1970s, Torello had become a high-ranking member within the Outfit.  In 1973, with the death of Fiore "Fifi" Buccieri, Torello became the Outfit's chief enforcer.  He also became involved in loan sharking, illegal gambling and pornography.

In the late 1970s Torello bought a home in Palm Springs, California, and in April 1979, he died of cancer at Northwestern Memorial Hospital in Chicago.  He was 49.

References

 Sifakis, Carl. The Mafia Encyclopedia. New York: Da Capo Press, 2005.

Further reading
 United States. Congress. Senate. Committee on Governmental Affairs. Permanent Subcommittee on Investigations. Organized Crime in Chicago: Hearing Before the Permanent Subcommittee on Investigations. 1983.
 United States. Congress. Senate. Committee on Governmental Affairs. Permanent Subcommittee on Investigations. Professional Motor Vehicle Theft and Chop Shops: Hearings Before the Permanent Subcommittee on Investigations. 1980.

External links
 TIME.com: The Mafia – Big, Bad and Booming
 Chicago Syndicate.com Bribes to a top Chicago cop detailed
 American Mafia.com ORGANIZED CRIME AND THE LABOR UNIONS
  UNITED STATES OF AMERICA v. NICHOLAS W. CALABRESE, et al.
 

1930 births
1979 deaths
American gangsters of Italian descent
Chicago Outfit mobsters
People from Palm Springs, California